Ragged Top Mountain is a summit located in the Trinity Range in the U.S. state of Nevada.

Ragged Top Mountain was so named for its jagged peak, which is likened to ruins.

In 1867, Timothy H. O'Sullivan took pictures of the area as part of the Geological Exploration of the Fortieth Parallel.

References

Mountains of Pershing County, Nevada